Agnes Brown(e) or Broun may refer to:

Agnes Brown (17th century), alleged witch of Guilsborough, England
Agnes Broun (1732–1820), mother of Robert Burns
Agnes Brown (19th century), early business owner in Walnut Grove, California
Agnes Brown (suffragist) (1866–1943), Scottish suffragist and writer
Agnes Browne, a 1999 Irish film
Agnes Brown (Mrs. Brown's Boys), a fictional character in Mrs. Brown's Boys